Michael Mulcahy (born 23 June 1960) is a former Irish Fianna Fáil politician. He was a Teachta Dála (TD) for the Dublin South-Central constituency from 2002 to 2011.

A barrister and graduate of Trinity College Dublin, Mulcahy entered politics as a member of Dublin Corporation, where he served from 1985 to 2003. He was Lord Mayor of Dublin from 2001 to 2002. He is a son of John Mulcahy, the proprietor of The Phoenix magazine and founder of the Sunday Tribune newspaper, and Nuala Mulcahy.

He was first elected to Dáil Éireann on his fifth attempt at the 2002 general election and was re-elected at the 2007 general election.

He had previously served as a Senator in the 20th Seanad, to which he was nominated by the Taoiseach, Albert Reynolds.

He lost his seat at the 2011 general election.

References

1960 births
Living people
Alumni of Trinity College Dublin
Fianna Fáil senators
Fianna Fáil TDs
Irish barristers
Lord Mayors of Dublin
Members of the 20th Seanad
Members of the 29th Dáil
Members of the 30th Dáil
Nominated members of Seanad Éireann
People from Ranelagh